The 1976–77 Phoenix Roadrunners season was the third and final season of the Phoenix Roadrunners in the World Hockey Association (WHA). The Roadrunners finished sixth in the Western Division and did not qualify for the playoffs.

Offseason

Regular season

Final standings

Game log

Playoffs

Player stats

Note: Pos = Position; GP = Games played; G = Goals; A = Assists; Pts = Points; +/- = plus/minus; PIM = Penalty minutes; PPG = Power-play goals; SHG = Short-handed goals; GWG = Game-winning goals
      MIN = Minutes played; W = Wins; L = Losses; T = Ties; GA = Goals-against; GAA = Goals-against average; SO = Shutouts;

Awards and records

Transactions

Draft picks
Phoenix's draft picks at the 1976 WHA Amateur Draft.

Farm teams

See also
1976–77 WHA season

References

External links

Phoe
Phoe
Phoenix Roadrunners seasons